The flag of Minnesota is the state flag of the U.S. state of Minnesota. Its design features a modified version of the seal of Minnesota emblazoned on a blue field. The first version of the flag was adopted in 1893, in advance of the state's mounting an exhibition at the 1893 Chicago World's Fair. It was significantly revised in 1957 and received a minor update in 1983. 

In recent years the flag has come under growing criticism. Longstanding design concerns about the illegibility of the flag have been joined by concerns that the image depicted by the seal offers a revisionist view of Minnesota’s settlement by Europeans that conceals the violence committed against indigenous peoples. A bill was introduced in the 2021–2022 session of the Minnesota Legislature to create a task force to discuss possibilities for flag modification and replacement, but this failed in committee.

Design and use
The design and use of Minnesota's flag is prescribed by Section 1.141 of the state statutes. 

The flag is rectangular and features a design emblazoned in the center of a field of medium blue. According to statute, the flag is bordered with gold and finished with gold fringe, but this is rarely used.

The central design features three concentric circular fields. The innermost field is filled with a simplified version of the state seal. Around the seal is a ring of blue ornamented with a wreath of pink-and-white lady's-slipper and a red ribbon upon which are written the years 1819 and 1893. At the top of the blue ring the year 1859 is set in gold. Around the blue ring is a white ring upon which 19 stars form five radially arrayed groups. Each group contains four stars except for the top-center group which has two stars of the standard size and one star larger than the rest. Between the bottom two groups the name of the state is set in red. Both the blue ring and the white ring are bordered with gold.

Design and symbolism of the seal

A Native American rides on horseback in the background, symbolizing Minnesota's Native American heritage.  A sun on the western horizon is a sunset. The straight horizon line reflects the plains covering much of Minnesota. The Native American is on horseback is riding towards the south. The native's horse and spear and the pioneer's ax, rifle, and plow represent tools of daily life. The only interaction between the figures is one observing the other.  The tools used by the Native American and the farmer represent the tools used for labor and hunting, while the stump symbolizes the taming of the land and the importance of the lumber industry to Minnesota in 1858. The Mississippi River and St. Anthony Falls are depicted in the revised seal to note the importance of these resources in transportation, industry and the settling of the state. The furrowing of the ground by the plow represents the submission of the land to the pioneer.  The plow also symbolizes the importance of agriculture to Minnesota and its future.  The waterfalls are not on the original state seal. Beyond the falls on the current seal are three pine trees representing the state tree and the three pine regions of the state; the St Croix, Mississippi, and Lake Superior.

Symbolism of other elements
Each of the three years cited was notable in Minnesota history. 1819 marked the founding of Fort Snelling; 1858 marked Minnesota’s gaining of statehood; 1893 marked the adoption of first flag.

The pink-and-white lady's slipper is the state flower.

The 19 stars symbolize the fact that Minnesota was the nineteenth state to enter the Union after the original thirteen. The larger star at the top symbolizes the North Star.

Display and use

The flag is to be flown over the Minnesota State Capitol from sunrise to sunset.

When the flag is folded for storage, it should be folded in the same way as the national flag. When folding the flag for presentation or display, it must be folded lengthwise four times, then each side must be folded down so that the banner containing  is displayed on a triangle. The ends below the triangle must be folded in a complicated way to form a triangle that is then tucked into the upper triangle so that the state motto is prominently displayed on the front. (This method has been been criticized as being over complicated.)

Desecration
Mutilating, defiling, or casting contempt upon the flag, attaching any design to the flag, or using the flag for advertising are misdemeanor offenses under State Statute 609.40, excepting flags on written or printed documents.

History

1893 flag

In 1891, the Minnesota legislature voted to sponsor an exhibition at the 1893 Chicago World's Fair, and in response then governor William Rush Merriam appointed a board to supervise the preparations. The board comprised only men, but preparations specific to the showcasing of "women's work" were passed off to a group of all-women volunteers known as the Women's Auxiliary Board. Minnesota had no official flag at that time, and the Auxilary Board formed a six-person committee to design a flag. The committee held a contest to design the flag, and 200 entries were submitted. In February 1983, Amelia Hyde Center was announced the winner and received $15 for her winning design. The Board then successfully petitioned the legislature to officially adopt the design as the state flag.

Center's design was white on one side and bright blue on the other. In the center was the state seal wreathed with white moccasin flowers, on a blue field. A red ribbon in the seal bore a motto,  (French for "The Star of the North"). The years 1819 (establishment of Fort Snelling), 1858 (statehood), and 1893 (adoption of the flag) appeared in gold around the state seal. "Minnesota" was written under the state seal in gold and 19 gold stars arranged in clusters to form the points of a star, representing the fact that Minnesota was the 19th state to be admitted after the original 13 states. The first Minnesota flag was made of silk and was embroidered by Pauline and Thomane Fjelde, who won a gold medal for their creation. The flag was adopted on April 4, 1893. 

Historians have noted the design may have been influenced by the various flags used by Minnesota's infantry regiments during the Civil War. Many consisted of a blue background with an American eagle or the state seal with a scroll.

1957 flag

The flag was redesigned in 1957 in advance of the 1958 state centennial. Most significantly, the field of both the obverse (formerly white) and the reverse (formerly bright blue) were made royal blue; the unification allowed flags to be produced from a single piece of cloth, reducing manufacturing costs and making the flag more durable in high winds. Separately, the white lady's-slippers depicted in the orginal were replaced with the pink-and-white lady's-slipper native to Minnesota.

1983 revision
In 1983 the seal was redrawn, and the color field was lightened from a royal blue to a medium blue.

Criticism and calls for redesign

The Minnesota flag has been widely criticized for decades. Derision of its over complex design and relative illegibility has been common at least since the 1980s. In 1989, the St. Paul Pioneer Press held an unofficial contest to design a new state flag. The winning design by vexillologists William Becker and Lee Herold, called the North Star Flag, received endorsements from state politicians and newspapers including the Star Tribune. In 2001, the flag was chosen as one of the ten worst flag designs in an online poll conducted by the North American Vexillological Association (NAVA). The survey consisted of 100 NAVA members and 300 members of the public. Minnesota received a score of 3.13 on a scale of 1 to 10, on par with other flags that consisted of the state seal on a blue background, which were ranked very unfavorably.

In the past decade, the flag's design failings have been overshadowed by the symbolism of the seal, which has been prominently criticized for offering a fundamentally racist, revisionist view of Minnesota’s settlement by Europeans. 

On numerous occasions over a span of several decades, bills have been introduced in the Minnesota Legislature to establish a legislative task force for studying changes to the flag. , no changes to the flag have been made.

See also

State of Minnesota
List of Minnesota state symbols
Great Seal of the State of Minnesota

References

External links

The Minnesota Flag Statute
The Origin of the Minnesota State Flag
North Star Flag Website

Minnesota
Symbols of Minnesota
Flags of Minnesota
Minnesota
Flag controversies in the United States